The Labor Research Association (LRA) was a left-wing labor statistics bureau established in November 1927 by members of the Workers (Communist) Party of America. The organization published a biannual series of volumes known as the Labor Fact Book; it compiled and produced statistics and information for use by trade unions and political activists. The LRA has been frequently characterized as a front organization of the Communist Party. Jonathan Tasini was the executive director of the Labor Research Association in 2008.

Organizational history

The Labor Research Association (LRA) was established late in 1927 by International Publishers president Alexander Trachtenberg and several individuals formerly associated with the Socialist Party's Rand School of Social Science, including Scott Nearing, Solon DeLeon, and Robert W. Dunn. In addition, founders included the prominent radical intellectuals Anna Rochester and Grace Hutchins.  

According to American communist writer Myra Page, her husband John Markey (writing as "John Barnett") began working there in 1930, at which time LRA's directors included Anna Rochester, Bob Dunn, Grace Hutchins, Carl Haessler, and Charlotte Todes Stern (another John Reed Club member, along with her husband Bernhard Stern). Edward Dahlberg contributed writings.  Dunn, Hutchins, and Rochester published Labor Fact Book.

Originally conceived and organized by Trachtenberg, LRA was announced at the November 2, 1927 meeting of the Political Committee of the Workers (Communist) Party. The organization's declared task was "to conduct research into economic, social, and political problems in the interest of the American labor movement and to publish its findings in articles, pamphlets and books." To this end, from 1931 to 1963, the LRA published a biannual series of statistical and political yearbooks called The Labor Fact Book. These were produced by International Publishers.

The LRA tried to established connection between the labor movement and the Communist movement.

Labor Fact Book volumes
1931
1934
1936
1938
1941
1943
1945
1947
1949
1951
1953
1955
1957
1959
1961
1963
1965

See also
 Bureau of Industrial Research

References

Organizations established in 1927
Communism in the United States
Communist Party USA mass organizations
1927 establishments in the United States